Tony Duran is an American photographer, known for his photographs of celebrities and his work with male models. Duran is one of the most widely published photographers of celebrities. He has photographed a "virtual who's who of the Hollywood and fashion set." Widely revered in the fashion industry, Duran has been called both "genius" and "brilliant," and his work has been said to express "unrivaled artistic vision"

Early life
Tony Duran was born and raised in Winona, Minnesota. He attended the University of Minnesota.

Career
While at university Durgan he got his start in professional photography with a project called "All Women at hte U of M Are Not Fat and Ugly". His shots of one student won her the "Look of the Year" contest, which had previously been won by professional supermodels including Cindy Crawford. This launched his career as what Los Angeles Magazine called "a talented though technically untrained photographer." One of his notable shoots was of Jennifer Lopez for the cover of Glamour. 

Duran is known for photographing nude and semi-nude models. This has led to lists such as Trend Hunter's "12 most scandalous Tony Duran photos." He also uses strange imagery and props in his work. This has led to some mocking reviews. His work with Beyoncé was reviewed by The Daily Mirror as looking like something out of Star Trek. Additionally, Duran is known for using his history as a student of art in his photography. His lack of formal training as a photographer – and his formal training as an artist – allow him to "capture a sensual side not often revealed in his subjects."

References

External links
UWEC article
Vibe article
Duran's Website

Living people
American photographers
University of Wisconsin–Eau Claire alumni
Artists from Minnesota
People from Winona, Minnesota
Year of birth missing (living people)